Saunders Island   is an island in North Star Bay, Baffin Bay in the Avannaata municipality of northwest Greenland. The island is named after Commander James Saunders of the British Royal Navy.

Geography
The island lies off the southern shore of the mouth of Wolstenholme Fjord, north of Wolstenholme Island. Geologically it is composed of stratified rock. It is the largest island in the bay, flat-topped and with steep sides, with a landspit in the northeast. The channel to the south, between Saunders Island and the mainland is known as Bylot Sound.

Important Bird Area
The island has been designated an Important Bird Area (IBA) by BirdLife International because it supports a breeding population of some 143,000 pairs of thick-billed murres, as well as other seabirds, including northern fulmars and black guillemots.

History
Under Commander James Saunders,  sailed to the Arctic in 1849 in the spring on a venture to search and resupply Captain Sir James Clark Ross' expedition, who in turn had sailed in 1848 trying to locate the whereabouts of Sir John Franklin's expedition.

Failing to find Franklin or Ross, Saunders's mission aboard North Star consisted in depositing stores along several named areas of the Canadian Arctic coast and returning to England before the onset of winter. However, James Saunders's ship became trapped by ice off the coast of northwest Greenland in North Star Bay. During the winter 1849–50 Saunders named numerous landmarks in that area, including Saunders Island, while wintering in the frozen bay.

The Literary Expedition led by Ludvig Mylius-Erichsen wintered in 1903–1904 on the island. Its aim was to make ethnographic research of the local Inuit. Knud Rasmussen, Harald Moltke and Jørgen Brønlund were also part of this venture.

See also
 List of islands of Greenland
 70th meridian west

References

External links
 
 NASA - IceBridge Survey Flight Over Saunders Island and Wolstenholme Fjord

Uninhabited islands of Greenland
Avannaata
Important Bird Areas of Greenland
Important Bird Areas of Arctic islands
Seabird colonies